Amarlu District is a district (bakhsh) in Rudbar County, Gilan Province, Iran. At the 2006 census, its population was 7,970, in 2,350 families.  The District has one city: Jirandeh.  The District has two rural districts (dehestan): Jirandeh Rural District and Kalisham Rural District. Most people of Amarlu District are Tat and they speak Tati.

Tribes
Amarlu has been one of the dominant Kurmanj tribes in Gilan Province. According to Rabino, the Rashvands formed another inhabitant of the region too.
Rišvand formed part of the Bâbân tribe of Solaymâniya and were moved to Gilân by Shah 'Abbâs I. Later, they were chased out of most of their choice pasturelands by the 'Amârlu, who were moved to Gilân from northwestern Persia by Nâder Shah (Rabino, 1916–17, pp. 260–61; tr., pp. 304–6). The Rišvand now live mostly in Qazvin province. The 'Amârlu occupy some fifty villages between Menjil and Pirâkuh in southeastern Gilân. (See Fortescue, pp. 319–20; Mardukh Kordestâni, I, pp. 100–1; Afšâr Sistâni, pp. 132–34.)

Flora 
Flora in the region includes:
Juniperus polycarpus
Pteropyrum aucheri
Rosa canina
Rhus coriaria
Pistacia sp.
Rhamnus pallasi
Lilium ledebourii

and grasses and herbs such as:

Astragalus marschallianus
Galium gilanicum
G. rotundifolium
Teucrium polium
Verbascum thapsus
Artemisia herbaalba

Notable people
 

Manutchehr Salimi, politician

References

Rudbar County
Districts of Gilan Province